Leiosaurus jaguaris is a species of lizard in the family Leiosauridae. It is native to Argentina.

References

Leiosaurus
Reptiles described in 2007
Reptiles of Argentina